Damon and Debbie is a three-part spin-off from the Channel 4 soap opera Brookside first broadcast in November 1987. A Mersey Television production, it was written by Frank Cottrell-Boyce, directed by Bob Carlton, and produced by Colin McKeown. The series is credited as the first 'soap bubble'.

The series followed teen sweethearts Damon Grant (Simon O'Brien) and Debbie McGrath (Gillian Kearney) as they absconded to York to escape their disapproving parents in Liverpool who objected to the relationship because of the class divide. It ended with the death of Damon, who had been a regular character in Brookside since its launch in 1982.

Production

Development

Damon and Debbie was developed in response to several factors, according to Brookside creator Phil Redmond. Firstly, the producers were keen to develop further "high-octane storylines" having seen the audience and media response to 1985's siege storyline, in which nurses Pat, Sandra and Kate were held hostage in their home, concluding in the latter's murder. Actor Simon O'Brien, who had played Damon Grant since the show's first episode in 1982, said he not only wished to leave the show, but requested that his character be killed off. Additionally the intention was to celebrate Brooksides fifth anniversary in November 1987, and the production team and executives were keen to mark the occasion.

The Grant family had recently featured in major storylines, particularly the rape of Sheila Grant (played by Sue Johnston, and Damon was used to illustrate the problems of the Thatcher ministry's Youth Training Scheme (YTS), which saw Damon, who expected to be employed by a firm for whom he had worked for low wages, but being told that the company were simply going to replace him with further cheap labour at the end of his service in the scheme. Following both of these storylines, executive producer Phil Redmond suggests, Damon's departure would have to be "something a bit special".

The producers developed the idea of a 'soap bubble', a term which Redmond credits to Channel 4 executive David Rose, so that the multi-stranded narrative of Brookside would continue during the standard episodes, with two characters co-existing in a separate production. Damon and Debbie is generally recognised as the first instance of a UK soap opera expanding its narrative world in such a way. According to Annie Leask of The Sunday Mirror, the spin-off was a result of the characters' popularity with the viewing public.

The character of Debbie McGrath (Gillian Kearney) was introduced into Brookside as Damon Grant's girlfriend. Her being younger than Damon caused friction between the parents of both characters, alongside a class-divide, a plot-line which saw one critic refer to it as like "Romeo and Juliet in trackies". When their parents objected to them dating, the couple decided to elope from Liverpool to York, an adventure which was depicted in Damon and Debbie.

Filming

Filming took place over six weeks. The scenes in which Debbie attends an open day were filmed on 19 September 1987 at the University of York. The same corridor was used several times for the scenes in which Damon tries to find her, with the furniture rearranged to make it appear different each time. The computer graphic ("Damon loves Debbie") that Debbie programs within a few minutes was programmed by Charles Forsyth.

Episodes

The three-part series was broadcast late on Wednesday evenings on Channel 4 in November 1987, with an omnibus edition screened over the Christmas period of that year.

Following the broadcast of Damon and Debbie, the storyline returned to Brookside. Police are seen arriving to break the news to Sheila Grant (Sue Johnston) in episode 529, broadcast on 23 November 1987. Debbie returned to Brookside, and Damon's funeral was featured in the episode of Brookside broadcast on 1 December. Crosby actor Jonathan Comer, the extra who played the part of Damon's killer, began to receive threatening phone calls and hate mail shortly after the episode was broadcast.

Music
The music played over the opening and closing credits was written by Steve Wright, who had also written the Brookside theme. Dani Ali performed "Talk to Me", a song written for the show's closing credits, on episodes one and three, with a recording by English singer-songwriter Annabel Lamb accompanying the credits of episode two. Both versions of the song were releases on the Ariola label through BMG; Ali's version as the A-side, with Lamb's version on side B (titled "Her Song"). There is no record of the single gaining a chart position. The title was also the closing spoken line of dialogue in all three episodes.

Main cast
Damon Grant – Simon O'Brien
Debbie McGrath – Gillian Kearney
Lettuce – Siobhan Maher
Mr McGrath – Nick Maloney
Nick – John Basham
Barbara/Bridget McGrath – Annie Tyson
Lonnie – Neil Caple
Tone – Geof Atwell
Zoe – Jaye Griffiths
Jenny – Michelle Holmes
Kirk – Ian Ormsby-Knox
Patrick – Lyndam Gregory
Apala – Seeta Indrani
Sadhir – James Neale-Kennerley

References

Bibliography

External links
 

1980s British television miniseries
British television spin-offs
Channel 4 original programming
Works by Frank Cottrell-Boyce
1987 British television series debuts
1987 British television series endings
1980s British drama television series
Brookside
English-language television shows
Television series about teenagers
Television shows set in Yorkshire